Final league standings for the 1928-29 St. Louis Soccer League.

League standings

Top Goal Scorers

External links
St. Louis Soccer Leagues (RSSSF)
The Year in American Soccer - 1929

1928-29
1928–29 domestic association football leagues
1928–29 in American soccer
St Louis Soccer
St Louis Soccer